Hatfield and the North is the first album by the English Canterbury scene rock band Hatfield and the North, released in February 1974.

In the Q & Mojo Classic Special Edition Pink Floyd & The Story of Prog Rock, the album came #34 in its list of "40 Cosmic Rock Albums".

Album cover
The cover of the original vinyl release was designed by Laurie Lewis.  The front and back outer cover is a panoramic photograph of Reykjavík, with the sky on the right merged with a transparency of a 15th-16th century fresco in Orvieto Cathedral by Luca Signorelli, "The Damned".
The inside gatefold is a collage that includes photographs of the personnel and guests involved in the music, the cast of the TV show Bonanza, together with a cropped photograph by Jacques Henri Lartigue of a man throwing a dog.

Track listing

The 1987 CD re-release of the album added two bonus tracks, the A- and B-sides of a 1974 single, previously available on the 1980 compilation Afters:

"Let's Eat (Real Soon)" (Sinclair, Pyle) – 3:16
"Fitter Stoke Has a Bath" (Pyle) – 4:35

The 2009 Esoteric Recordings reissue (ECLEC2139) also included the above, along with a further bonus track:

"Your Majesty Is Like a Cream Donut Incorporating Oh What a Lonely Lifetime" – 6:08
Taken from the Virgin Records Sampler (VD 2502) from January 1975.

Personnel
Hatfield and the North
Phil Miller – electric guitar , acoustic guitars 
Dave Stewart – Fender Rhodes electric piano , Hammond organ , Hohner Pianet , piano , tone generator , Minimoog 
Richard Sinclair – bass guitar , vocals 
Pip Pyle – drums , percussion , sound effects 
Guest musicians
Robert Wyatt – vocals 
Barbara Gaskin – vocals 
Amanda Parsons – vocals 
Ann Rosenthal – vocals 
Geoff Leigh – tenor saxophone , flute 
Didier Malherbe – tenor saxophone  (uncredited)
Jeremy Baines – pixiephone , flute 
Sam Ellidge – voice 
Cyrille Ayers – vocals

References

1974 debut albums
Hatfield and the North albums
Albums produced by Tom Newman (musician)
Virgin Records albums